Township Line Road station, formerly known as West Overbrook station, is a SEPTA rapid transit station in Haverford Township, Pennsylvania. It serves the Norristown High Speed Line (Route 100) and is located at Township Line Road (U.S. Route 1) and Grove Place, although SEPTA gives the address as being at City and Grove Place. Only local trains stop at Township Line Road.

Station layout

References

External links

Township Line Road Route 100 Station (The Subway Nut.com)
 Township Line Road entrance from Google Maps Street View

SEPTA Norristown High Speed Line stations